Adolph "Ed" Chester Czerkiewicz (listed in some sources as Czerchiewicz; March 5, 1913 – January 7, 1990) was an American soccer right fullback who spent eight seasons in the American Soccer League and was a member of the United States national team at the 1934 FIFA World Cup.

Club career
In 1933, Czerkiewicz began his club career with the Pawtucket Rangers of the American Soccer League (ASL).  Rangers lost the 1934 National Challenge Cup final to Stix, Baer and Fuller F.C., and again in 1935 to St. Louis Central Breweries F.C.  After the 1935 loss, Czerchiewicz moved to the New York Americans. After just one season, he moved to Brooklyn St. Mary's Celtic where he again lost a Challenge Cup final.  In 1939, Czerkiewicz finally took home the National Challenge Cup when St. Mary’s Celtic defeated Chicago Manhattan Beer.  Czerkiewicz was drafted into the U.S. Army during World War II.  When the war ended, he joined Pawtucket F.C.  In 1942, Czerkiewicz lost his fourth Challenge Cup final when Pawtucket fell to Pittsburgh Gallatin.

National team
Czerkiewicz earned two caps with the U.S. national team in 1934.  His first game was a 4-2 World Cup qualifier victory over Mexico on May 24, 1934.  This win put the U.S. into the 1934 FIFA World Cup.  In the game, Czerkiewicz assisted on Aldo Donelli’s goal, the first of the game.  Czerkiewicz then played in the U.S.’s 7-1 loss to Italy in the first round of the finals.

Personal life and death
Czerkiewicz's first name was Adolph, but he played under the nickname "Ed", which has led some sources to list him as "Ed", "Eddie" or "Edward" His Army induction records show him as Adolph C. Czerkiweicz.

Czerkiewicz died in Warwick, Rhode Island on January 7, 1990, at the age of 76.

References

External links
National Soccer Hall of Fame info
National Soccer Hall of Fame eligibility bio
1934 World Cup Roster

1913 births
1990 deaths
American soccer players
United States Army personnel of World War II
United States men's international soccer players
1934 FIFA World Cup players
American Soccer League (1933–1983) players
Pawtucket Rangers players
New York Americans (soccer) (1933–1956) players
Brooklyn St. Mary's Celtic players
People from West Warwick, Rhode Island
Soccer players from Rhode Island
Association football defenders